Mbula (also known as Mangap-Mbula, Mangaaba, Mangaawa, Mangaava, Kaimanga) is an Austronesian language spoken by around 2,500 people on Umboi Island and Sakar Island in the Morobe Province of Papua New Guinea. Its basic word order is subject–verb–object; it has a nominative–accusative case-marking strategy.

Name
Mbula speakers generally display difficulty expressing a name for their language. Historically it has been referenced as Mangap or Kaimanga but Kaimanga is considered an offensive term along the lines of "unsophisticated bush person". Mangap is not in known use; however, Mangaaba is the name given to Mbula speakers by Siassi Islanders. Mbula is the only name known to have been used by Mbula speakers themselves, though many of them are unfamiliar with this.

Language family and origin
Mbula is a member of the Oceanic group of Austronesian languages. It was originally proposed as a member of the Siassi language group which is a set of languages extending from Karkar Island in the Madang Province of Papua New Guinea, along the coast of Finschafen and across New Britain. However, more recent evidence suggests that it is a descendant of the Vitiaz Dialect Linkage. Its nearest genetic relations are the Kilenge and Maleu languages; its nearest geographic neighbour is the Papuan Kovai language.

Location
Mbula speakers are generally located in seven villages: Gaura, Yangla, Birik, Marile, Kampalap, Kabi and Sakar. These villages are located on Sakar Island and the eastern half of Umboi Island. Both islands are inactive volcanoes and both are rich in game, timber and fish. Location has influenced the language in that there are many specific vocabulary items for species of fish, shells, canoes, nets, spears and a pair of motion verbs  'to go out, appear, happen' and  'to enter' which specifically describe paths of motion which are radially outward toward the sea or radially inward from the sea.

People and culture
Colonialism has had a fair impact on the culture of Mbula speakers. Missionization began in 1884 and the vast majority of Mbula speakers now identify themselves as Christian. Some traditions are retained from tribal religions; foremost among them are those concerning sorcery, white magic and divination. A third kind, is considered the most evil, used only to kill or disable people.

Language contact
The Mangap-Mbula are part of a previously extensive trading network with bordering language groups, especially those in the Ngero language group of the Siassi islands which formed the hub of the trading network. As a result, approximately 65% of Mbula speakers are at least somewhat bilingual in Tok Pisin and some 30% speak and understand some Ngero. Due to missionization and other factors, 35% can speak and write English.

Phonology

Consonants
The consonant phonemes of Mbula are as shown in the following table:

The consonant  is realised as  intervocalically. Prenasalised stops, while requiring two phonetic units, exist as a single phonemic unit. The palatal glide  is treated as being underlyingly vocalic in morphophonemic analysis while the labio-velar glide  is analysed consonantally. All voiceless plosives, are optionally pronounced with a voiceless nasal release word finally.

Vowels
Mbula has five vowel phonemes as shown in the following table. Phonetically front vowels are unrounded and back vowels are rounded.  and  can be lax or tense and  can be half close tense and half open lax. All vowels can be short or long, though this is interpreted in the phonology as a sequence of two vowels rather than as the existence of long vowel phonemes.

Vowels are subject to two rules: penultimate lengthening, which means that external realisations may be long vowels while the underlying form is a short vowel, and epenthesis, which means the insertion of a vowel where the underlying form of the morpheme does not contain one. Epenthesis is regressive, which means that epenthetic vowels take on the quality of the first vowel in the rest of the form. Vowel length is contrastive as can be seen in the following examples:

  – 'long'
  – a type of ant
  – 'domestic animal'
  – 'new shoot of a plant'
  – 3SG 'be heavy'
  – 3SG 'reads'

Suprasegmentals
The placement of stress is predictable. In most words, primary stress falls on the penultimate syllable.

Syllable patterns
Syllable structure is generally (C)V(C).

Orthography
As stated above, vowel length is contrastive. What would be written phonetically as a: is represented by aa. All long vowels are written this way. All alveolars are dental-alveolars. They are represented in the orthography by t, d, n and nd. The  sound is represented by y. The complete orthography of Mbula is as follows:

Syntax and word classes
In an ideal grammar each classificatory word type would belong only to one category and in Mbula that is mostly the case. However, in the following three areas, word forms exist which are hard to nail down as one or the other:

verbs and prepositions
verbs and adverbs
verbs and instrumental nouns

The occurrence of a form in a wide range of conversational environments can result in the gradual loss of morphological features which are not appropriate to some particular conversational environments as well as the morphological gain of features which are appropriate to other conversational environments. This can mean ultimately either category shift of a word class or even just the general greying of the word classes as iron-clad categories.

Verbs and prepositions
Prototypical verbs and prototypical prepositions exist along a cline with verbs at the start, prepositions at the end, and multicategoried word types in the middle:

forms inflected with the subject prefixes which function syntactically only as predicates in sentences
forms not inflected with the subject prefixes which syntactically function only as predicates in sentences (the uninflected verbs discussed below in verbs)
forms potentially exhibiting subject agreement inflection which function syntactically as both predicates in sentences and in serial constructions (the prepositional verbs discussed below)
forms never exhibiting inflection and which function syntactically only as prepositions

Verbs and adverbs
Prototypical verbs and adverbs exist along a cline with verbs at the start, adverbs at the end and multicategoried word types in the middle:

inflected verbs which never occur as modifiers within the predicate phrase and never occur in cosubordinate adverbial predications
inflected verbs which never occur as modifiers within the predicate phrase, and can occur in either a preceding or following cosubordinate adverbial predication
uninflected verbs which never occur as modifiers within the predicate phrase, but which can occur in either a preceding or following cosubordinate adverbial predication
forms which can occur as modifiers in the predicate phrase after the object or occur as uninflected verbs in an adjacent cosubordinate adverbial predication
forms which occur immediately after the object and never function as predicates in an adjacent cosubordinate adverbial construction
forms which can occur immediately after the predicate and never function as a predicate in an adjacent cosubordinate adverbial construction

Verbs and instrumental nouns
Verbs and instrumental nouns crossover in that verbs theoretically derived from these nouns appear in an identical form. I.e., there is no overt morphological derivation which might indicate what direction the derivation has occurred in. Examples include:

 – 'wall'

 – 'to wall in'

 – 'paddle'

 – 'to paddle'

 – implement for sweeping

 – 'to sweep up' using this implement

 – 'a line'

 – 'to draw a line'

Nouns
There is no syntactic distinction between nouns and adjectives in Mbula. Nouns are syntactically distinguished by the following three characteristics:

They may function 'in isolation' (i.e. without any further syntactic modification) as arguments in a predication, a property that distinguishes them from non-inflecting stative verbs.
When functioning as the heads of noun phrases, nouns occur phrase initially with all modifiers following.
A subclass of nouns is morphologically distinguished by being obligatorily inflected with a set of genitive suffixes.

There are eight semantic features of noun referents which are especially important for characterising the morphosyntactic behaviour of Mbula nouns:

human referent
animate referent
potent (the referent of the noun can be viewed as the ultimate cause of some process which affects another entity)
concrete (the noun can potentially refer to a physical location to which, at which, or from which an event takes place)
temporal (the noun may be used to delineate the time at which an event takes place)
potentially consumable (the referent of the noun can be eaten or drunk)
individuated/count (the referent of the noun may be easily separated from its environment and may not be divided without changing its essential nature/character)
inalienable genitive (the referent of the item is inherently associated with some other entity)

Pronouns
Pronouns make the following person/number distinctions.

1 singular
1 dual exclusive
1 dual inclusive
1 plural exclusive
1 plural inclusive
2 singular
2 dual
2 plural
3 singular
3 dual
3 plural

Pronouns also inflect for nominative, accusative, referent and locative cases. Most pronouns are composed of an initial case marker plus a person-number marker. The nominative series of pronouns is generally used to encode animate participants which function as subjects. Accusative pronouns encode animate participants which function as objects. The referent pronouns encode virtually any animate oblique argument. Locative pronouns indicate an animate location toward which an action is taking place in dynamic predications, or at which an item is located. The locative form is also used to encode possession. Interrogative pronouns such as who, when, where, operate in a replacement fashion. That is, the interrogative pronoun is used in place of the normal syntactic position of the item being questioned.

Verbs
The characteristic syntactic function of verbs is to act as the heads of predications in which they occur. They are defined by a number of properties:

They typically index the person and number of the subject of the sentence.
They may contain transitivity-altering prefixes.
They may not function as noun-phrase modifiers in certain frames.

Uninflected verbs
There are several categories of non-inflecting verbs in Mbula:

stative experiential verbs
stative verbs encoding properties
verbs of manner
aspectual verbs

All of these non-inflecting verbs function only as predicates in clauses. Thus they cannot function as heads of noun phrases and they cannot function as restrictive modifiers of nouns unless they are relativised or nominalised. Syntactically, they resemble inflected verbs. They are only distinguished from other verbs morphologically.

Adverbials
This class is called adverbials and not adverbs because Mbula contains a large collection of words which are defined as modifiers of constituents other than nouns. Semantically, such forms typically encode notions of time, aspect, manner and modality.

Quantifiers
Quantifiers are uninflected forms which always occur in noun phrases following nouns, locative/alienable genitive pronouns, and attributive stative nouns, but before determiners, locative/alienable genitive prepositional phrases, relative clauses and demonstratives. The Mbula counting system is based upon the notions of five and twenty.

Prepositions
Prepositions are generally uninflected forms which govern a single noun phrase complement and relate it to a head or predicate. Mbula employs five categories of prepositions:

the referent preposition  used for oblique arguments
the locative preposition  used for animate goals towards which some entity moves, sites at which some entity is located and body parts which perceive something
the preposition  used to express resemblance, similarity or approximate equality (i.e., like, as)
the comitative and manner prepositions  used for accompaniment and manner
prepositional verbs discussed below

Prepositional verbs
These forms are a set of optionally inflected verbs which occur in serialisations functioning as case markers. As they may potentially contain inflection for third person singular in these serialisations, they depart from the typical uninflected preposition. However, they retain the prepositional function of relating a dependent noun phrase to a verbal head.

Demonstratives

Historical demonstratives and deictic expressions
Regarding the deictic term for 'that, there', there does not seem to be a major change in the pronunciation of the term in Mangap-Mbula from Proto-Malayo Polynesian (PMP).

Morpho-syntactic features
Demonstrative pronouns and spatial deictic expressions
Mangap-Mbula has three different free demonstrative pronouns which do not differentiate between singular and plural:

In Example 1,  is a free demonstrative used situationally and functions as a modifier of a singular noun phrase, as it is introducing the 'younger brother'. Additionally,  also has two other functions.

It is frequently being used to refer to non-humans, and its main function is to reestablish a participant, who has already been introduced, as a topic or to single them out. In Example 2,  is referring to two non-human, singular entities: the wallaby and the tree kangaroo. As the direct translation for each of these entities were not mentioned here, it can be inferred that they are both used anaphorically.

In Example 3,  is a free demonstrative used situationally and conveys two pieces of information: (1) the entity to which it is referring to, and (2) its location in reference to the speaker (i.e. a place adverb).

Locative adverbial forms
In Mangap-Mbula, there are no differences between deictic expressions that denote noun phrases and ones that denote location in sentences. Thus, they are considered as being a single form class.

In Examples 4 and 5,  is used situationally as a place adverb for where a group of people work and where in relation to the speaker, is the house located, respectively.

Problems with prepositions

Examples 6, 7, and 8 demonstrate that the demonstrative  and the adverbial  are semantically and positionally similar to the preposition phrase . This resemblance suggests that both could potentially fall under the same category of prepositional phrases, which further suggests that prepositions could be split into a transitive (location adverbs and demonstratives) and intransitive (true prepositions) sub-category. However, viewing things this way could have two issues: (1) the adverbial  would have to be left as being noun phrase modifiers, but this could be due to the semantics; (2) the noun phrase shows the demonstrative occurring after the 'true' prepositiona' phrase with the noun phrase complement. But if both are deemed as coming from the syntactic group, why then would there be an ordering restriction? As a result of these problems, a demonstrative form class is recognised.

Noun phrases

In the examples given above,  is used situationally as a determiner for either the chicken (Example 9), the woman (Example 10) or the tree (Example 11).  refers to the specific entity (i.e. 'that'), and  refers to the entity that has already been revealed in the sentence. In Example 10 however, the woman is not present situationally, but is referred to hypothetically.

There are two functions of : (1) as a demonstrative, or (2) to convey reason-result sequences. They are homophones. The demonstrative denotes (1) entities that are accessible or nearby the speaker and (2) textually revealed participants.

Motion verbs

Similar to many other Oceanic languages, Mangap-Mbula makes a three-way distinction depending on relative space: near speaker, near hearer or near neither. This sense of deictic orientation can be conveyed in motion verbs through the use of suffixes. These verbs often compound the root (which states the spatial positioning of motion) and the deictic orientation of motion in regards to the speaker and listener. This is shown in Table 2.

These are some examples:

These are all examples of bound deictic morphemes.

Aerial comparison

Other Oceanic languages which share the same pronunciation for the term  (meaning 'that, there') have a slightly different meaning, such as Suau and Motu, where  means 'this', and Chuukese, where  means 'there it is (by you)'. There are also other Oceanic languages with a closer meaning to Mangap-Mbula's , but have an additional sound at the beginning. They are Dobuan (where  means 'that') and Nakanamanga (where  means 'that (distant)').

Mangap-Mbula is a noun-demonstrative order language. This order is usual for neighbouring languages in the Morobe Province, such as Sio and Selepet, as well as in West New Britain, such as Maleu and Amara. Examples 9, 10 and 11 demonstrate this lexical ordering.

Complementizers
Complementisers are uninflected forms which only govern a following sentence. The combination of a complementiser and a following sentence becomes the constituent in a noun or predicate phrase. Mbula contains seven types of complementiser:

 – lest (I don't want this to happen)
 ~ nothing – non-presupposition of factuality (I do not say this is something which has happened)
 – like (I think like this)
nothing – asserted factuality (I say this is something which has happened or is happening)
 ~ nothing – presupposed factuality (I know that this is something which has happened and I think you know about it too)
 – presupposed non-factuality (I know that this is something which has not happened and I think you know about it)
 – habitual event (This is the kind of thing that is always happening)

Conjunctions
There are a great deal of conjunctions in Mbula that each encode their own subtly different meaning. However, all conjunctions fall broadly into four categories: temporal conjunctions, conditional conjunctions, causal conjunctions and disjunctions.

Interjections
There are a number of interjections in Mbula, all of which play no role in the grammar of the language, but which function to convey the speaker's attitudes and intentions. They always occur sentence initially and include the following examples:

 – I want to say something
 – I want something
 – I hear something, I don't know what it is
 – I don't know
 – I want to ask you something
 – I do not agree with you
 – I say you did something good
 – I think you are bad

Morphology
Word structure in the Mbula language is not complex. There is little inflection of both nouns and verbs and few derivational processes. Most words in Mbula are mono-morphemic. Multi-morphemic words can be formed via the following processes:

indexing on verbs for the person and number of the Subject
inflection of inalienable nouns for the person and number of their genitives
reduplication
derivation of predicates to increase or decrease their transitivity
compounding
nominalisation

These processes will be discussed below.

Inflectional morphology
The only types of inflectional processes in the language are on verbs for the person and number of the subject, inflection of inalienable nouns for the person and number of their genitives as well as pronoun person/number distinctions.

Verbal inflection
Verbs typically index the person and number of the subject of the sentence with the following set of subject prefixes:

1sg – 

2sg – nothing ~ 

3sg – 

1pl.inc – 

1pl.exc – 

2pl – 

3pl –

Inflection of inalienable nouns
Mbula contains a class of nouns which are obligatorily inflected with genitive suffixes. Inalienable describes the semantic nature of the nouns. That is, they are semantically considered in speakers’ minds to be inalienable or inseparable from something. Examples include body parts and family members – concepts which exist in relation to something else, just the way an edge cannot exist without being the edge of something. Following is a list of the genitive suffixes:

gen.1sg – 

gen.2sg – 

gen.3sg – VnV

gen.1pl.inc – ndV

gen.1pl.inc – 

gen.2pl – 

gen.3pl –

Pronoun inflection
Pronouns in Mbula inflect for first, second and third person as well as singular, dual and plural, as well as inclusive and exclusive in the first person. They also change depending on whether they are in the nominative, accusative, referent or locative case. The following table details the paradigm:

Derivational morphology
The following types of derivation occur in Mbula: compounding of nouns and verbs, creation of nouns by means other than compounding, derivational devices which alter the transitivity of verbs, reduplication and some other minor processes. Compounding is not a very productive process in Mbula though is far more common in verbs than in nouns. Verbs can compound with adverbs, nouns and other verbs to create verbs. Nouns are more likely to be derived by the nominalising suffix . When combined with adverbs it yields stative nouns; with nouns it can either signal an intensification of meaning or a slight change in meaning (with no intensification); it turns stative verbs into stative nouns and dynamic verbs into nouns. Semantically,  derivations tend to convey the idea of generic, habitual or characteristic actions. Finally, reduplication can result in any one of the following meanings: plurality, distribution, intensification, diminution or habitual-durative action (action that is somehow extended).

References

Sources

External links
 

Ngero–Vitiaz languages
Subject–verb–object languages
Languages of Morobe Province